MSC Daniela is the lead ship of her class of container ship operated by the Mediterranean Shipping Company that at  is one of the largest container ships of the world, with a twenty-foot equivalent unit (TEU) cargo capacity of 14,000 containers. The building of MSC Daniela was started on 1 July 2006 and finished at the end of 2008; the ship was subsequently crowned as the largest according to cargo capacity. The shipbuilder was Samsung Heavy Industries in Geoje, South Korea.

However, MSC Daniela is now neither the longest container ship in the world, nor does it have the largest tonnage.

Design
The deadweight tonnage (DWT) of the vessel is 165,000 metric tons and the gross tonnage (GT) is 135,000 gross tons. The ship is large and requires a strong and reliable engine.

Operational history
Firefighting efforts were coordinated by the Sri Lankan Navy and Colombo Port Authority which evacuated her crew and returned the ship safely to port. The ship was repaired jointly by the CIC Changxing Shipyard and COSCO Qidong Offshore and was successfully redelivered to MSC in late August.

See also

References

ShipsInfo.info Container Ship Website

External links

Container ships
Merchant ships of Panama
2008 ships
Ships built by Samsung Heavy Industries